Antimony chloride may refer to either of the following:

Antimony trichloride, SbCl3
Antimony pentachloride, SbCl5